The 1938 East Tennessee State Teachers Buccaneers football team was an American football team that represented State Teachers College, Johnson City—now known as East Tennessee State University (ETSU)—as a member of the Smoky Mountain Conference in the 1938 college football season. Led by seventh-year head coach Gene McMurray, the Buccaneers compiled an overall record of 6–2 with a mark of 5–1 in conference play, winning the Smoky Mountain Conference title for the first time since joining the conference in 1929. McMurray was assisted by former team captain, Walter Clark.

Schedule

References

East Tennessee State Teachers
East Tennessee State Buccaneers football seasons
East Tennessee State Teachers Buccaneers football